Peter Richard Baelz (1923-2000) was an Anglican priest and theologian. 

Born on 27 July 1923, he was educated at Dulwich and Cambridge University, where he won a tennis blue. He trained for ordination at Westcott House, Cambridge, and was ordained in 1950  and began his career with curacies in Bournville and Sherborne. After this he held incumbencies at Wishaw, Warwickshire  and Bournville, Birmingham. From 1960 to 1972 he was Fellow and Dean of Jesus College, Cambridge and a Lecturer in Divinity. From 1972 to 1980, he was Regius Professor of Moral and Pastoral Theology at the University of Oxford and finally Dean of Durham from 1980 until 1988. An eminent author, he  died on 15 March 2000.

Notes

1923 births
People educated at Dulwich College
Fellows of Jesus College, Cambridge
Deans of Durham
English Anglican theologians
2000 deaths
Regius Professors of Moral and Pastoral Theology
20th-century Anglican theologians